William Kropp (born March 12, 1990) is an American professional golfer who plays on PGA Tour Latinoamérica.

Kropp turned professional in 2013 after having captained the Oklahoma Sooners golf team during his senior year at the University of Oklahoma. Kropp's first professional win came at the 2013 OK Kids Korral Championship on the Adams Pro Tour.

The win and other performances in 2013 earned Kropp his membership on PGA Tour Latinoamérica for the 2014 season. Kropp was quickly able to capitalize achieving his first win on the tour at the Abierto OSDE del Centro in just his fifth start on the tour. With this win, Kropp moved to number 617 and inside the top 1000 on the Official World Golf Ranking for the first time in his career. He also finished third at the Stella Artois Open and fifth at the Dominican Republic Open and tenth at the Brazil Open, ending tenth in the Order of Merit.

Professional wins (2)

PGA Tour Latinoamérica wins (1)

Adams Pro Tour wins (1)
 2013 OK Kids Korral Championship

Playoff record
Web.com Tour playoff record (0–1)

References

External links

American male golfers
PGA Tour Latinoamérica golfers
Oklahoma Sooners men's golfers
Golfers from Indiana
Golfers from Oklahoma
Sportspeople from Indianapolis
Sportspeople from Edmond, Oklahoma
1990 births
Living people